A list of films produced by the Tollywood (Bengali language film industry) based in Kolkata in the year 1934.

A-Z of films

Notes

References
 Bengali Film Directory – edited by Ansu Sur, Nandan, Calcutta, 1999

External links
 Tollywood films of 1934 at the Internet Movie Database
Tollywood films of 1934 at gomolo.in

1934
Lists of 1934 films by country or language
Films, Bengali